Second Nature is the second studio album by Welsh mezzo-soprano Katherine Jenkins, released on 18 October 2004, in the UK. It charted at number 16 on the UK Albums Chart and at number 1 on the UK Classical Album Chart.

The album was released as La Diva in 2005 in the US and Canada.  It peaked at #16 on the US Classical Albums chart.

Track listing 
 "Time to Say Goodbye"
 "Caruso"
 "Va Pensiero"
 "House of No Regrets"
 "O Sole Mio"
 "En Aranjuez con tu Amor"
 "Seguidilla"
 "Song to the Moon"
 "Vide Cor Meum" (with Rhys Meirion)
 "Calon Lân"
 "Hymn to the Fallen"
 "Barcarolle"
 "Laudate Dominum"
 "O Holy Night"
 "You'll Never Walk Alone"

Canadian track listing 
 "Time To Say Goodbye"
 "Caruso"
 "Va Pensiero"
 "House of No Regrets"
 "O Sole Mio"
 "En Aranjuez Con Tu Amor"
 "Séguédilla"
 "Song to the Moon"
 "Calon Lan"
 "Hymn to the Fallen"
 "Laudate Dominum"
 "You'll Never Walk Alone"

Certifications

References 

Katherine Jenkins albums
2004 albums
Universal Classics and Jazz albums